Amblyeleotris marquesas is a species of goby only recorded from reefs around Nuku Hiva in the Marquesas Islands, French Polynesia in the central Pacific Ocean at depths of .  As with other species of their genus, this species has a symbiotic relationship with alpheid shrimps, in this case Alpheus randalli, one or a pair of gobies sharing a burrow with one or a pair of shrimps.

This is an elongated goby up to  standard length. It has a highly distinctive colour pattern: The background colour is pale green, white ventrally, marked with four broad vertical brownish red bars interspersed with four narrower, darker bars.

References

External links
 Photograph

marquesas
Fish described in 2002